Miguel Ángel Poveda León  (born 13 February 1973) is a Spanish flamenco singer known by his stage name Miguel Poveda.

Biography
Born in Barcelona, Spain, his father is from Lorca in Murcia and his mother from Puertollano (Castilla-La Mancha). Poveda is a flamenco singer and interpreter of other genres. He has collaborated with artists from various disciplines who were previously unknown to flamenco audiences. In 2003, he moved to Seville. He often collaborates with Spanish flamenco guitarist Juan Gómez "Chicuelo", with whom he has toured extensively in Europe, Japan and the US.

Discography

  (1998)
  (2001)
  (2005)
  (2006), with Juan Carlos Romero
  (2009), with Joan Albert Amargós & Chicuelo
  (2009), with Joan Albert Amargós & Chicuelo
  (2010)
  (2012)
  (2012)
  (2013), with Rodolfo Mederos
  (2018)
  (2021)

References

External links
  

1973 births
People from Barcelona
Flamenco singers
Singers from Catalonia
Living people
Spanish LGBT singers
21st-century Spanish singers
LGBT people in Latin music